HMS Dartmouth was a 50-gun fourth rate ship of the line of the English Royal Navy, launched at Rotherhithe on 24 July 1693.

She was captured by the French in 1695. Her service as HMS Vigo was short however, as she was wrecked in on the Dutch coast on 25 November 1703.

Notes

References

Lavery, Brian (2003) The Ship of the Line - Volume 1: The development of the battlefleet 1650-1850. Conway Maritime Press. .

Ships of the line of the Royal Navy
1690s ships
Maritime incidents in 1703